Josef Fales (Yosyp Heorhiyovych Fales, 12 June 1938 – 17 October 2022) was a Czechoslovakian-born Soviet footballer, coach and Ukrainian sports specialist, and scientist.

Fales was born in Svalyava on 12 June 1938. He was known as a defensive player who played for number of clubs among which are Trudovye Rezervy from Lviv and Leningrad (Saint Petersburg), Karpaty Lviv and others. After his sports career, Fales became docent and head of football department in the Lviv State University of Physical Culture.

Fales died on 17 October 2022 in Lviv, at the age of 84.

Further reading
 Pylypchuk, P. Football personalities of Lviv. "Halych Publishing Society, Lviv. 2008.

External links
 Brief information on Lviv sports college website
 Josef Fales on footballfacts.ru
 Yosyp Fales – 78. FC Karpaty Lviv. 12 June 2016

References

1938 births
2022 deaths
Association footballers not categorized by position
FC Karpaty Lviv players
Academic staff of the Lviv State University of Physical Culture
People from Svaliava
SKA Lviv managers
Soviet football managers
Soviet footballers